is a 2000 Japanese film directed by Takashi Miike, adapted from the novel by Yōji Hayashi.

Plot
Japanese businessman Kohei Hayasake of Sanyu Trading is arrested for possession of a kilo of heroin in Manila and sent to a prison there. Umino, a restaurant owner in Manila, introduces Kohei to Yoshida, a former member of the criminal underworld who has chosen to be imprisoned in order to escape from his enemies, who hires Kohei to be his business representative in exchange for permission to use Yoshida's private toilet. Yoshida bribes the guards to let him take Kohei to a hotel to purchase a kilo of heroin but Kohei uses the opportunity to escape and runs to the hotel where his wife is staying but finds that she did not return to the hotel the previous night. Yoshida finds Kohei and insists that he will kill him if Kohei betrays him again.

Yoshida sells the drugs through the warden, who states that Kohei must produce money for bribes in order to win his case. The pedophile Sakamoto takes Kohei to a club where he is drugged and taken to a room to have his organs removed for sale but Yoshida finds him and rescues him. Kohei leaves his wife after determining that she is sleeping with the company's lawyer. At his trial, Kohei is sentenced to life in prison.

During the next drug deal, Kohei is attacked by members of Yoshida's old yakuza clan, who state that Yoshida's real name is Murakame. Kohei escapes and is driven back to the prison by Brando, a prisoner who once had a legal dispute with Kohei's company. Yoshida's assistant Belila is shot dead by an attacking gunman while she is stabbing him to death.

When the poor inmates gang up against the privileged Japanese inmates working with Yoshida, Brando distracts them by throwing money on the ground, allowing the Japanese men to escape. As they are escaping they stop to help an injured woman. They take her to her village, where Sakamoto treats her as well as the numerous ill children of the village. Taro, an unfulfilled comic book artist who meditates and speaks to himself all day, is worshiped as a god by the villagers.

The yakuza Yabumoto who is chasing Murakame arrives in the village and kills Sakamoto then points his gun at Kohei before Murakame arrives to surrender himself. Convicted embezzler Namie Mishima from the women's wing of the prison offers Yabumoto gemstones worth millions, throwing them at him as Kohei pulls a gun from the back of her shorts and kills Yabumoto. The yakuza fire on Kohei and Namie but Umino jumps in front of them and saves their lives.

Murakame decides to return to prison, while Taro stays in the village. Using the pseudonym Mabini, Kohei wins the Philippine presidential election, hoping to turn around the economy and the country for the sake of the people.

Cast
Koji Kikkawa as Kōhei Hayakawa
Nene Otsuka as Namie Mishima
Kenichi Endō as Toshiyuki Umino
Kazuhiko Kanayama as Kōji Sugimori
Toshiyuki Kitami as Tadashi Yabumoto
Kenji Mizuhashi as Philippines Tarō
Mai Oikawa as Miyuki Hayasaka (Kōhei's wife)
Hideo Sako
Monsour Del Rosario
Hua Rong Weng as Jun Sakamoto
Mitsuhiro Oikawa as Kashiwagi
Naoto Takenaka as a mysterious man
Tsutomu Yamazaki as Katsuaki Yoshida

Other credits
Produced by
Sonny Cabalda - line producer: Philippines unit
Renzo Cruz - producer: Philippines unit
Donnie Gonzales - supervising producer: Philippines unit
Masanobu Hamasaki - executive producer
Yue Hayashi - producer
Miyoshi Hikawa - producer
Production Design: Tatsuo Ozeki
Makeup Department
Laila Baum	.... 	key hair and makeup stylist: Philippines unit
Production Management: Ulysses Formanez - production manager: Philippines unit
Assistant Directors
Lito Mena	.... 	assistant director: Philippines
Jojo Salamante	.... 	assistant director: Philippines
Leo Valdez	.... 	assistant director: Philippines
Art Department
Winky Gonzales	.... 	art director: Philippines
Ramon Nicdao	.... 	set decorator: Philippines
Ruben Arthur Nicdao	.... 	production designer: Philippines
Sound Department
Yoshiya Obara	.... 	sound
Kenji Shibazaki	.... 	sound effects
Special Effects by
Apeng Salen	.... 	special effects: Philippines unit

other
Lisa Araki	.... 	interpreter: Philippines
Mario Belasquez	.... 	interpreter: Philippines
Jojo Bineda	.... 	interpreter: Philippines
Marvin Cruz	.... 	office staff: Philippines
Victoria Custodio	.... 	interpreter: Philippines
Lino Dalay	.... 	wardrobe master: Philippines
Karen Ann Domingo	.... 	production assistant: Philippines
Karyll Endaya	.... 	production assistant: Philippines
Mildred Formanez	.... 	armorer: Philippines
Sonia Lago	.... 	interpreter: Philippines
Efren Laihee	.... 	transportation coordinator: Philippines
Masaharu Oomi	.... 	timing
Narding Ortega	.... 	schedule master: Philippines
Alvin Palencia	.... 	production assistant: Philippines
Lulu Penarroyo	.... 	interpreter: Philippines
Rudy Ramirez	.... 	fight choreographer: Philippines
Jasmine Rellosa	.... 	field cashier: Philippines
Janice Reyes	.... 	production secretary: Philippines
Mar Sacdalan	.... 	chief of security: Philippines
Melissa Sibayan	.... 	production assistant: Philippines
Roland Siglos	.... 	interpreter: Philippines
Cherry Sy	.... 	production assistant: Philippines
Alex Toledo	.... 	production assistant: Philippines
Marie Yamamoto	.... 	interpreter: Philippines

Release
The film premiered at the 13th Tokyo International Film Festival on October 30, 2000.

References

External links
 
 天国から来た男たち(2001) at allcinema 
 天国から来た男たち at KINENOTE 

Films directed by Takashi Miike
2000 films
2000s prison films
Japanese prison films
2000s Japanese-language films
2000s Tagalog-language films
Films about organ trafficking
Films about the illegal drug trade
Films set in Manila
Films shot in the Philippines
2000s English-language films
2000s Japanese films